United Cities and Local Governments (UCLG) is an umbrella international organisation for cities, local and regional governments, and municipal associations throughout the world that is concerned with representing and defending the interests of local governments on the world stage.

The organization achieved inclusion of Goal 11: Sustainable cities and communities into Agenda 2030, aggregates best local practices into action plans, provides regular updates on the progress and proposals to High-level Political Forum on Sustainable Development. Its day-to-day activities include hosting meetings of mayors and other local and regional leaders, running joint projects with partners, organizing international peer-to-peer training on local policies and practices, and advocacy for the interests of local and regional governments at the UN

Since founding in 2004, UCLG is headquartered in Barcelona (the World Secretariat, Metropolis and UCLG Regions), with its regional offices in Brasilia, Brussels, Istanbul, Jakarta, Kazan, La Paz, Ottawa & Rabat. It is the largest organization of sub-national governments in the world, with over 240,000 members in over 140 UN Member States and understands itself as the united voice and world advocate of democratic local self-government, de facto representing over half the world's population across seven world regions: Africa, Asia-Pacific, Euroasia, Europe, Middle East & West Asia, Latin America and North America.

The organisation's work programme focuses on:
 Increasing the role and influence of local government and its representative organisations in global governance;
 Becoming the main source of support for democratic, effective, innovative local government close to the citizen;
 Ensuring an effective and democratic global organisation

History 

UCLG's origins go back to 1913, when the Union Internationale des Villes (UIV) was set up at the International Congress of the Art of Building Cities and Organising Community Life in Ghent, Belgium. The establishment of the UIV, a permanent office for communication and documentation on municipal issues, marked the birth of the international municipal movement. The association had a Provisional Council of 30 members and its first seat was in Brussels. In 1928, the UIV changed its name to the International Union of Local Authorities (IULA). In 1948, IULA's secretariat moved from Ghent to The Hague in the Netherlands, where it remained until 2004. 
The United Towns Organisation (UTO) (French: Fédération mondiale des cités unies (FMCU)) was set up in 1957 in Aix-les-Bains, France. It was initially known as the World Federation of Twin Cities (French: Fédération mondiale des villes jumelées).

In 1984, then President of the Regional Council of Ile-de-France, Michel Giraud, convened the first Metropolis Congress. The constituent Congress of Metropolis was held in Montreal in April 1985, and was attended by 14 founding member cities: Abidjan, Addis Ababa, Barcelona, Buenos Aires, Cairo, Colombo, Ile-de-France, London, Los Angeles, Mexico, Montreal, New York, Tokyo and Turin. The Metropolis secretariat was initially established in Montreal, moving to Barcelona under the presidency of then Mayor of Barcelona, Joan Clos, in 2000. In 2004, three international associations of local and regional governments – the International Union of Local Authorities (IULA), United Towns Organisation (UTO), and Metropolis – agreed to come together to form a single organization at UCLG's founding congress.

The united organization started under the leadership of its founding President Bertrand Delanoë, mayor of Paris, serving two three-year terms (2004-2010) and continued under Kadir Topbaş of Istanbul (2010-2016).

Organization and membership 
UCLG is a membership organization with a democratic, federal structure. Its members include individual local and regional governments and their national associations. UCLG's governing bodies are made up of locally elected leaders, chosen by their peers in elections by UCLG members.

Sections 

 Africa Section (UCLG Africa)
 Asia Pacific Section (UCLG-ASPAC)
 Eurasia Section (UCLG Eurasia)
 Europe Section - Council of European Municipalities and Regions (CEMR)
 Middle East and West Asia Section
 Latin American Coordination of Local Authorities for Unity in Diversity (CORDIAL, co-hosted by FLACMA & Mercosur Cities Network)
 North America Section (UCLG - Noram, hosted by Federation of Canadian Municipalities)
 Metropolitan Section (Metropolis)
 Forum of Regions (UCLG Regions)

Governing bodies

General Assembly

World Council 

UCLG's main policy-making body is the World Council. It has over 300 members from all world regions and meets no less than once every three years. Previous meetings were in Madrid (2018) & Hangzhou (2017).

Executive bureau 
The UCLG Executive Bureau is made up of 115 members. It meets twice a year and makes proposals and carries out the decisions of the World Council.

Presidency 
The presidency of the UCLG world network is made up of the president, six co-presidents and the treasurer, accompanied by two special envoys.

The presidency for the 2021-2024 period is:

President: Ilsur Metshin, Mayor of Kazan, Chaiman of UNACLA.

Co-presidents:

 Uğur İbrahim Altay, Mayor of the Metropolitan Municipality of Konya (Turkey)
 Johnny Araya Monge, Mayor of San José (Costa Rica)
 Anne Hidalgo, Mayor of Paris (France)
 Li Mingyuan, Mayor of Xi'an (China)
 Jan van Zanen, Mayor of Utrecht (Netherlands)

Treasurers: 
 Berry Vrbanovic, Mayor of Kitchener (Canada) and 
 Madelaine Y. Alfelor-Gazman, Mayor of Iriga (Philippines)

Special Envoy to the United Nations: Ada Colau, Mayor of Barcelona (Spain)

Special Envoy of the Presidency to the New Urban Agenda: Carlos Martínez Mínguez, Mayor of Soria (Spain)

World Secretariat 

Current UCLG Secretary-General is Emilia Saiz, who was named in December 2017 to replace outgoing Josep Roig.

Cross-sectional deliberative bodies 
There are 19 permanent UCLG Cross-sectional bodies.

Policy councils 
There are four UCLG policy councils: 
 Right to the City and Inclusive Territories
 Opportunities for All, Culture and City Diplomacy: Keys to Sustainable Development and Peace
 Territorial Multilevel Governance and Sustainable Financing
 Safer, Resilient and Sustainable Cities, Capable of Facing Crises

Each Policy Council can have up to 15 representatives with a political mandate, with at least one member of the Presidency. These report at each Executive Bureau session.

Policy committees 

There are four UCLG policy committees:
 Culture 
 Social Inclusion, Participatory Democracy and Human Right
 Urban Strategic Planning
 Local Economic and Social Development

Working groups 
There are two UCLG working groups:
 Capacity and Institution Building
 Territorial Prevention and Management of Crises

Communities of practice 
There are six UCLG communities of practice:
 Urban Innovation
 Mobility
 Social Economy
 Food Security
 Transparency and Accountability
 Digital Cities

Fora 
There are three UCLG Ffora:
 Intermediary Cities
 Peripheral Cities
 Local Government Associations

Events 

UCLG meets for World Summits, regular Congresses, Executive Bureau meetings & Reunions, organized by the World Secretariat & UCLG Sections. It also organizes various seminars and trainings. The upcoming event is World Summit in Durban on 11–15 November 2019.

Projects

Global Taskforce of Local and Regional Governments (GTF)
UCLG facilitates the Global Taskforce of Local and Regional Governments (GTF), a coordination and consultation mechanism that brings together the major international networks of local governments to undertake joint advocacy work relating to global policy processes. The Global Taskforce was set up in 2013 to bring the perspectives of local and regional governments to the SDGs, climate change agenda and New Urban Agenda, in particular. As well as UCLG, Global Taskforce participants include ICLEI and C40 Cities.

United Nations Advisory Committee of Local Authorities (UNACLA)
The United Nations Advisory Committee of Local Authorities (UNACLA) was established by the UN Habitat Governing Council Resolution 17/18 of 1999 as an advisory body to strengthen the dialogue of the UN System with local authorities in relation to the implementation of the Habitat Agenda. UCLG chairs UNACLA and holds 10 of its 20 seats. UCLG co-hosts the UNACLA secretariat with UN-Habitat.

See also 
 Agenda 21 for culture

References

External links 
 
 Metropolis
 UNACLA

 
International political organizations
Municipal international relations